The Plessur Region is one of the eleven administrative districts in the canton of Graubünden in Switzerland. It was created on 1 January 2017 as part of a reorganization of the Canton.

Municipalities

Mergers
On 1 January 2020 the former municipality of Maladers merged into Chur.
On 1 January 2021 the former municipality of Haldenstein merged into Chur.

References

Alpine Rhine basin
Regions of Graubünden
Engadin